The 1956 Washington State Cougars football team was an American football team that represented Washington State College during the 1956 NCAA University Division football season. Led by first-year head coach Jim Sutherland, the team posted a 3–6–1 overall record, and were 2–5–1 in the Pacific Coast Conference.

Hired in January, Sutherland was previously an assistant at rival Washington for a season  under head coach John Cherberg, preceded by two years at California under Pappy Waldorf. His initial contract with the Cougars was for three years, estimated at $12,000 per year, and he led the program for eight seasons, through 1963.

Schedule

NFL Draft
One Cougar was selected in the 1957 NFL Draft, which was thirty rounds (360 selections).

References

External links
 Game program: Stanford vs. WSC at Spokane – September 22, 1956
 Game program: Oregon State at WSC – October 20, 1956
 Game program: USC at WSC – November 3, 1958
 Game program: Washington vs. WSC at Spokane – November 24, 1956

Washington State
Washington State Cougars football seasons
Washington State Cougars football